Jackie Clarke (born 1949) was an Irish soccer player during the 1960s and 1970s.

An amateur and youth international, Jackie was a defender who played for Shamrock Rovers and Bohemian amongst others during his career in the League of Ireland. Clarke came from a proud sporting family; his father Mattie Clarke won the FAI Cup 4 times with Rovers. Jackie matched him in 1970 when he was part of Bohemians' FAI Cup winning team.

He made his Rovers debut on 20 April 1966  Signed for Celtic in July 1968  Returned to Bohs in November 1969.

Honours
FAI Cup: 1
 Bohemians - 1970

References

Sources 
 The Hoops by Paul Doolan and Robert Goggins

Republic of Ireland association footballers
League of Ireland players
Shamrock Rovers F.C. players
Bohemian F.C. players
Celtic F.C. players
Living people
1949 births
Association footballers from Dublin (city)
People educated at Rockwell College
Association footballers not categorized by position